Ireland was involved in the Coalition Wars, also known as the French Revolutionary (1792–1802) and Napoleonic (1804–1815) Wars. The island, then ruled by the United Kingdom, was the location of the Irish Rebellion of 1798, which was aided by the French.  A minor, abortive uprising in 1803 resulted in the death of Ireland's chief justice, although this rising was not aided by the French.

Background
Although parts of Ireland had been under English control since the twelfth century, the English (after 1706 British) government was in control of the entire island by 1700. By this time, several wars had occurred, including the Nine Years' War (1594–1603), the Cromwellian conquest (1649–1653), and the Williamite War (1688–1691, part of the larger War of the League of Augsburg).

Anti-British (and anti-Protestant) sentiment was high in largely Catholic Ireland (with the exception of Protestant-majority Ulster), despite the repeal of most of the restrictive Penal Laws, instituted by the Protestant government in London after the Williamite War, in which Irish rebels had turned out in support of ousted Catholic monarch James II, formerly king of England. The Penal Laws, introduced during the reign of Dutch-born king William III, prohibited Catholics from keeping arms, among other things.

An exodus of Catholic Irish aristocrats, known as the Flight of the Wild Geese, was also a major event in 18th-century Ireland. This exodus provided nations such as France and Spain with elite units often known as Irish Brigades. Among the more well-known was that of the French Bourbon monarchy. Even after the monarchy's fall in the French Revolution, Irish-descended soldiers served successive governments.

By the early 1790s, tensions in Ireland – and in continental Europe – had grown. On the Continent, the new French Republic was embroiled in wars with Britain, the Holy Roman Empire, and other states. In Ireland, many dissenters, inspired by events of the French Revolution, founded the Society of United Irishmen, with early members including Theobald Wolfe Tone and Henry Joy McCracken.

1798 Irish rebellion

Prelude

British officials in Ireland had been suspicious of the intentions of the United Irishmen since the founding of the organisation. When, in 1794, dealings between Tone and the French government were discovered, the group was broken up. It soon reorganised, becoming more secretive and even more determined to overthrow the British government in Dublin.

In late 1796, a large French invasion armada, carrying as many as 14,000 soldiers, arrived off Ireland's south coast.  Dangerous weather forced the fleet to return to France, though, and a rebellion, seemingly imminent, failed to materialise.

By 1798, the British had succeeded in attempts to jail leaders of the United Irishmen and had even infiltrated the organisation.  British excesses against the Catholic population were often ignored by the authorities.

Uprising

Despite these British measures, and the lack of French assistance, the long-expected Irish revolt broke out in late May 1798.  Rebels seized mail coaches near Dublin, giving the signal that the revolt was to begin. A blow was handed to the United Irishmen, spearheading the revolt, when Dubliners did not rise up against the British, but the uprising was rejuvenated by an unexpected turn of events in County Wexford, where a detachment of North Cork Militia had been attacked.

Loyal forces in Wexford managed to hold several key towns, and the rebels in this area were defeated in the Battle of Vinegar Hill in June.  When a small French force landed in Ireland that month, they achieved an initial victory but were soon defeated and forced to surrender.

Other revolts across Ireland, including one in Ulster, were also suppressed.

Aftermath
The rebellion was soon completely suppressed, in part because of the efforts of Lord Cornwallis, the British lord-lieutenant.  In the aftermath of the uprising, the Irish Parliament was dissolved and the island fell under the complete jurisdiction of the British Parliament at Westminster.

Ireland in the Napoleonic Wars
By 1803, the French Revolutionary Wars (or those of the First and Second Coalitions) had ended, with the 1799 rise of Napoleon Bonaparte to the French First Consulate and, a few years later, the imperial throne.  A peace had been established between the warring nations of Europe, but it did not last long.  The War of the Third Coalition broke out in 1803, and, that same year, a minor revolt, known as the Emmet Rebellion, occurred in Ireland.

Emmet's rising
Along with fellow nationalists, Robert Emmet and his elder brother Thomas, both members of the weakened United Irishmen, planned a second Irish rebellion for 1803, this time with French aid expected.  When, in July of that year, an arsenal of the rebel group exploded, Robert Emmet advanced the uprising, now ruling out any chance of French involvement. A crowd of about 200 Dubliners began to march on Dublin Castle, the British seat of government, under the command of Robert (Thomas was in France, negotiating with Napoleon).

The major event of this revolt was the death of Viscount Kilwarden, the British chief justice of Ireland.  As the rebels approached, Kilwarden, fearing for his safety, fled his home with his daughter and a nephew, Reverend Wolfe.  The rebels surrounded the chief justice's carriage, killing his nephew and nearly killing Kilwarden.

Robert Emmet had not authorised the attack (Kilwarden died later) and, seeing that rebels in the countryside had not risen, fired a flare, the signal to call off the uprising.  A few of his men refused to obey orders and attacked British soldiers, who retreated to their barracks. The revolt was over quickly.  Robert Emmet was arrested and later executed.

Quiet in Ireland
After Emmet's abortive rising, there were no instances of unrest in Ireland until after 1815, when the Napoleonic Wars ended with Bonaparte's final defeat, the Battle of Waterloo.  Some Irishmen, including Robert Emmet's brother Thomas, had by then become hostile to the French, embittered toward them for failing to offer greater assistance in the revolts and for refusing to plan any more invasions after 1803.

References

History of Ireland (1801–1923)
Coalition Wars
French Revolutionary Wars
Napoleonic Wars